The 1999 DieHard 500 was the ninth stock car race of the 1999 NASCAR Winston Cup Series season and the 30th iteration of the event. The race was held on Sunday, April 25, 1999, before an audience of 100,000 in Lincoln, Alabama at Talladega Superspeedway, a 2.66 miles (4.28 km) permanent triangle-shaped superspeedway. The race took the scheduled 188 laps to complete. In the final laps of the race, Richard Childress Racing driver Dale Earnhardt would manage to hold off the field on the final restart with 15 to go to win his 72nd career NASCAR Winston Cup Series victory and his first of the season. To fill out the podium, Robert Yates Racing driver Dale Jarrett and Roush Racing driver Mark Martin would finish second and third, respectively.

Background 

Talladega Superspeedway, originally known as Alabama International Motor Superspeedway (AIMS), is a motorsports complex located north of Talladega, Alabama. It is located on the former Anniston Air Force Base in the small city of Lincoln. The track is a tri-oval and was constructed in the 1960s by the International Speedway Corporation, a business controlled by the France family. Talladega is most known for its steep banking and the unique location of the start/finish line that's located just past the exit to pit road. The track currently hosts the NASCAR series such as the NASCAR Cup Series, Xfinity Series and the Camping World Truck Series. Talladega is the longest NASCAR oval with a length of 2.66-mile-long (4.28 km) tri-oval like the Daytona International Speedway, which also is a 2.5-mile-long (4 km) tri-oval.

Entry list 

 (R) denotes rookie driver.

Practice

First practice 
The first practice session was held on Friday, April 23, at 11:00 AM CST. The session would last for two hours and 55 minutes.

Final practice 
The final practice session, sometimes referred to as Happy Hour, was held on Saturday, April 24, at 1:00 {M CST. The session would last for one hour.

Qualifying 
Qualifying was split into two rounds. The first round was held on Friday, April 23, at 3:00 PM CST. Each driver would have two laps to set a fastest time; the fastest of the two would count as their official qualifying lap. During the first round, the top 25 drivers in the round would be guaranteed a starting spot in the race. If a driver was not able to guarantee a spot in the first round, they had the option to scrub their time from the first round and try and run a faster lap time in a second round qualifying run, held on Saturday, April 24, at 10:45 AM CST. As with the first round, each driver would have two laps to set a fastest time; the fastest of the two would count as their official qualifying lap. Positions 26-36 would be decided on time, while positions 37-43 would be based on provisionals. Six spots are awarded by the use of provisionals based on owner's points. The seventh is awarded to a past champion who has not otherwise qualified for the race. If no past champion needs the provisional, the next team in the owner points will be awarded a provisional.

Five drivers would fail to qualify: Derrike Cope, Ken Bouchard, Dan Pardus, Dick Trickle, and Loy Allen Jr.

Full qualifying results 

*Time not available.

Race results

References 

1999 NASCAR Winston Cup Series
NASCAR races at Talladega Superspeedway
April 1999 sports events in the United States
1999 in sports in Alabama